Time Passes By is the sixth studio album by American country music artist Kathy Mattea. It was released in 1991 (see 1991 in country music) on Mercury Records. The album, like her last two studio albums before it, was certified gold by the RIAA. Singles released from it include the title track at #7, "Whole Lotta Holes" at #18, and "Asking Us to Dance" at #27. "From a Distance" was originally recorded by Nanci Griffith and later versions were released by Bette Midler and Judy Collins.

The album was produced by Allen Reynolds except "From a Distance", which Mattea co-produced with Jon Vezner and Dougie MacLean.

Track listing

Personnel
Adapted from Time Passes By liner notes.

Musicians
 Pat Alger - acoustic guitar (9)
 Craig Bickhardt - background vocals (4)
 Blair String Quartet (Grace Mihi Bahng, Connie Heard, John Kochanowski, Christian Teal) - strings (5)
 Bruce Bouton - steel guitar (8, 9)
 Mark Casstevens - acoustic guitar (6)
 Ashley Cleveland - background vocals (8)
 Bill Cooley - acoustic guitar (4)
 Jerry Douglas - Dobro (1, 2)
 Stuart Duncan - mandolin (8)
 Event in a Tent Memorial Choir - background vocals (11)
 Pat Flynn - acoustic guitar (8)
 Rob Hajacos - fiddle (2)
 Mark Howard - acoustic guitar (3), mandolin (3)
 Chris Leuzinger - acoustic guitar (1, 2, 3, 8), electric guitar (7, 10), acoustic slide guitar (7)
 Dougie MacLean - acoustic guitar (10, 11), background vocals (10), digeridoo (11), Overton whistle (11), congas (11)
 Kenny Malone - drums (4, 6)
 Kathy Mattea - tambourine (4), acoustic guitar (7, 11), background vocals (10), bodhrán (11), boomerang (11)
 Edgar Meyer - upright bass (4)
 John Mock - acoustic guitar (5)
 Duncan Mullins - bass guitar (1, 2)
 Mark O'Connor - mandolin (4), fiddle (6)
 Dave Pomeroy - bass guitar (5)
 Tom Roady - percussion (7, 10)
 The Roches - background vocals (2)
 Matt Rollings - piano (5)
 Milton Sledge - drums (1-3, 7-10)
 Will Smith - autoharp (3)
 Catherine Styron - piano (4)
 John Thompson - background vocals (8)
 Pete Wasner - piano (1, 2, 8, 10)
 Gary West - great Highland bagpipe (11)
 Bobby Wood - keyboards (4, 7), organ (8, 9)
 Glenn Worf - bass guitar (3, 6)
 Bob Wray - bass guitar (4, 7-10)
 Trisha Yearwood - background vocals (1, 8)
 Jonathan Yudkin - mandolin (10)

Technical
 Dougie MacLean - producer (11)
 Kathy Mattea - producer (11)
 Mark Miller - recording, mixing
 John Mock - string arrangements (5)
 Denny Purcell - mastering
 Allen Reynolds - producer (except 11)
 Jon Vezner - producer (11)

Production notes
 Produced by Dougie MacLean, Kathy Mattea, Allen Reynolds, Jon Vezner
Engineered by Jon Vezner and Mark Miller
Mastered by Denny Purcell
Mixed by Mark Miller
Art Direction and design by Billy Barnes

Charts

Weekly charts

Year-end charts

Release history

References

Allmusic (see infobox)

1991 albums
Albums produced by Kathy Mattea
Mercury Records albums
Kathy Mattea albums
Albums produced by Allen Reynolds